Telcagepant (INN) (code name MK-0974) is a calcitonin gene-related peptide receptor antagonist which was an investigational drug for the acute treatment and  prevention of migraine, developed by Merck & Co.

In the acute treatment of migraine, it was found to have equal potency to rizatriptan and zolmitriptan.

A Phase IIa clinical trial studying telcagepant for the prophylaxis of episodic migraine was stopped on March 26, 2009, after the "identification of two patients with significant elevations in serum transaminases".
A memo to study locations stated that telcagepant had preliminarily been reported to increase the hepatic liver enzyme alanine transaminase (ALT) levels in "11 out of 660 randomized (double-blinded) study participants."  All study participants were told to stop taking the medication.

In July 2011, Merck announced that it had discontinued development of telcagepant.

See also 
 Olcegepant

References 

Abandoned drugs
Antimigraine drugs
Azepanes
Imidazopyridines
Lactams
Fluoroarenes
Piperidines
Calcitonin gene-related peptide receptor antagonists
Ureas
Trifluoromethyl compounds